Delfan County is in Lorestan province, Iran. The capital of the county is the city of Nurabad. At the 2006 census, the county's population was 137,385 in 29,257 households. The following census in 2011 counted 144,161 people in 35,598 households. At the 2016 census, the county's population was 143,973 in 40,467 households.

Delfan is a mountainous region in the northwest of Lorestan province. The county is populated by Kurds.

Administrative divisions

The population history and structural changes of Delfan County's administrative divisions over three consecutive censuses are shown in the following table. The latest census shows three districts, 10 rural districts, and two cities.

References

 

Counties of Lorestan Province